John Ethelbert King Jr. (July 29, 1913 – June 28, 2008) was an American educator and academic administrator who was provost of University of Minnesota Duluth from 1947 to 1953, before serving as president of what is now Emporia State University from 1953 to 1966 and then the University of Wyoming from 1966–1967.

Professional life 

King was raised in Texas and was educated in University of North Texas with an undergraduate degree. He received his M.S. degree from University of Arkansas in 1937 and went on to earn his Ph.D. degree from Cornell University in 1941. During World War II he served as lieutenant in the United States Navy and was released from active service in 1946.

After the War, he served as the provost of University of Minnesota Duluth for six years before becoming the 11th president of Kansas State Teachers College, now Emporia State University in 1953. During his 13 year tenure as president, the enrollment increased six-fold, reaching its highest enrollment ever and scholarships are also increased in number.

In 1966, he left Emporia State to take a position as president of the University of Wyoming. From 1968 to 1970, he served as professor and chair of educational administration and foundations at Southern Illinois University (SIU), then becoming chair of the higher education department in 1970. He chaired or served on approximately 200 master’s or doctoral committees during his term at SIU.

He was recognized as an expert in teacher education and higher education governance, and was a pioneer in making higher education accessible to students with physical disabilities. President John F. Kennedy appointed him to the National Citizens' Advisory Committee on Vocational Rehabilitation in 1961 and President Lyndon B. Johnson appointed him to the National Committee on Employment of the Handicapped in 1964.

John E. King Hall at the Emporia State University, which houses the Theatre Department, and the Arts and Communication Departments, is named in his honor.

Personal life 
On Christmas day 1936 he married Glennie and went on to have two daughters Wynetka Ann and Rebecca and lived in West Columbia, South Carolina.

References

2008 deaths
Cornell University alumni
University of Arkansas alumni
University of North Texas alumni
University of Wyoming faculty
Presidents of Emporia State University
Emporia State University faculty
University of Minnesota Duluth faculty
1913 births
People from Oklahoma City
Presidents of the University of Wyoming
People from West Columbia, South Carolina
20th-century American academics